"Funiculì, Funiculà" is a Neapolitan song composed in 1880 by Luigi Denza to lyrics by Peppino Turco. It was written to commemorate the opening of the first funicular railway on Mount Vesuvius. It was presented by Turco and Denza at the Piedigrotta festival the same year. The sheet music was published by Ricordi and sold over a million copies within a year. Since its publication, it has been widely adapted and recorded.

History

"Funiculì, Funiculà" was composed in 1880 in Castellammare di Stabia, the home town of the song's composer, Luigi Denza; the lyrics were contributed by journalist Peppino Turco. It was Turco who prompted Denza to compose it, perhaps as a joke, to commemorate the opening of the first funicular on Mount Vesuvius in that year. The song was sung for the first time in the Quisisana Hotel in Castellammare di Stabia. It was presented by Turco and Denza at the Piedigrotta festival during the same year and became immensely popular in Italy and abroad. Published by Casa Ricordi, the sheet music sold over a million copies in a year.

Over the years the song has been performed by many artists including Erna Sack, Anna German, Mario Lanza, Beniamino Gigli, The Mills Brothers, Connie Francis, Haruomi Hosono (with lyrics translated into Japanese), Fischer-Chöre (with lyrics translated into German), the Grateful Dead, Luciano Pavarotti, Andrea Bocelli, Rodney Dangerfield, Alvin and the Chipmunks, The Wiggles, and Il Volo.

In 1960, Robert B. and Richard M. Sherman wrote a new set of English lyrics to the melody of "Funiculì, Funiculà" with the title "Dream Boy". Annette Funicello included the song on her album of Italian songs titled Italiannette and also released it as a single that became a minor hit.

Adaptations and unintentional plagiarism
German composer Richard Strauss heard the song while on a tour of Italy six years after it was written. He thought that it was a traditional Neapolitan folk song and incorporated it into his  tone poem. Denza filed a lawsuit against him and won, and Strauss was forced to pay him a royalty fee. Russian composer Nikolai Rimsky-Korsakov also mistook "Funiculì, Funiculà" for a traditional folk song and used it in his 1907 "" (Neapolitan Song).

Cornettist Herman Bellstedt used it as the basis for a theme and variations titled Napoli; a transcription for euphonium is also popular among many performers. Modernist composer Arnold Schoenberg arranged a version for ensemble in 1921.

In 1933, Arthur Fields and Fred Hall published a parody of "Funiculì, funiculà" titled "My High Silk Hat". This parody has been republished several times, including in the 1957 Gilwell Camp Fire Book.

In the late 1970s and in the 1980s the song was performed more than 20 times by the Grateful Dead during tunings.

Lyrics

Original Neapolitan lyrics

In Turco's original lyrics, a young man compares his sweetheart to a volcano, and invites her to join him in a romantic trip to the summit.

Traditional English lyrics

Edward Oxenford, a lyricist and translator of librettos, wrote lyrics, with scant relationship to those of the original version, that became traditional in English-speaking countries. His version of the song often appears with the title "A Merry Life".

Some think the world is made for fun and frolic,
And so do I! And so do I!
Some think it well to be all melancholic,
To pine and sigh; to pine and sigh;
But I, I love to spend my time in singing,
Some joyous song, some joyous song,
To set the air with music bravely ringing
Is far from wrong! Is far from wrong!
Listen, listen, echoes sound afar!
Listen, listen, echoes sound afar!
Tra-la-la-la! Tra-la-la-la!
Tra-la-la-la! Tra-la-la-la!
Echoes sound afar! Tra-la-la-la! Tra-la-la-la!

Some sing the world is set for freedom dancing,
But not so I! And not so I!
Some sing our eyes could keep from finally glancing,
Upon the sly! But not so I!
But all we're so amazing and so charming!
Divinely sweet! Divinely sweet!
And shortly, there's no time for pace and harming,
In nimble feet! In nimble feet!
Listen, listen, echoes sound afar!
Listen, listen, echoes sound afar!
Tra-la-la-la! Tra-la-la-la!
Tra-la-la-la! Tra-la-la-la!
Echoes sound afar! Tra-la-la-la! Tra-la-la-la!

Ah me! 'tis strange that some should take to sighing,
And like it well! And like it well!
For me, I have not thought it's worth the trying,
So cannot tell! So cannot tell!
With laugh, with dance and song the day soon passes
Full soon is gone, full soon is gone,
For mirth was made for joyous lads and lassies
To call their own! To call their own!
Listen, listen, echoes sound afar!
Listen, listen, echoes sound afar!
Tra-la-la-la! Tra-la-la-la!
Tra-la-la-la! Tra-la-la-la!
Echoes sound afar! Tra-la-la-la! Tra-la-la-la!

Notes

References

External links
 
 

"Funiculi, funicula" 1904 Victor recording by Ferruccio Giannini in Discography of American Historical Recordings at University of California, Santa Barbara
Performance by The Grateful Dead at Winterland Arena on 1977-06-09

Neapolitan songs
1880 songs
Internet memes introduced in 2015
Songs about Naples
Mount Vesuvius